Scinax iquitorum is a frog in the family Hylidae.  It is endemic to Peru.  It has been observed in the areas around Río Nanay and Río Yavari.

This frog is light olive-green on the dorsum. The flanks are yellow with black spots.  The rear sides of the thighs are black in color. The iris is gold to bronze.

References

Amphibians described in 2009
Frogs of South America
iquitorum